The Uprising of Sheikh Ubeydullah refers to a Kurdish uprising against the Ottoman Empire in 1879 and Qajar Iran between 1880 and 1881. Both uprising were led by Sheikh Ubeydullah, the leader of the Semdinan Naqshbandi family who claimed descendance from Mohammed through his daughter Fatima. Thus the family had a considerable influence, disposed over large amounts of donations, owned several villages in the region and many Kurdish tribal leaders were devout followers of him. The initial cause for the uprisings were the outcome of the Russo-Turkish war in 1877-78 and the Treaty of Berlin which provided the Christian Armenians and the Nestorians with considerable rights and autonomy, to which he did not agree to.

Uprising against the Ottoman Empire 
The possibility of a first uprising against the Ottoman Empire was given when the Herki tribe had a dispute with the Kaymakam of Yüksekova in 1879. Sheikh Ubeydullah sent out messengers to several Kurdish chieftains in order to gain their support and troops for an uprising against the Ottoman Empire. He managed to raise a small contingent of nine hundred tribes men which was led by his son Abdulkadir Ubeydullah onto Amadiya. But the Ottomans were informed by a rival Kurdish chieftain ahead of the uprising, and therefore deployed troops to Amadya as well. The uprising failed and was quickly subdued by the Ottomans. The Kurdish chieftains were not as trustworthy as hoped by Sheikh Ubeydullah, and preferred to expand their own areas of influence with raids. Sheikh Ubeydullah then also changed his mind and reassured the Sultan of his loyalty. The Ottomans reacted very to the Sheikhs pleasure, removed the Kaymakam of Yüksekova and encouraged him very cordially to find an agreement with the local Ottoman authorities.

Uprising against the Qajar Empire

Preparations 
As Ubeydullah prepared for an uprising against Iran, he relied on the support of the Ottomans. Sheikh Ubeydullah's troops still possessed weapons they received from the Ottomans during the Russo-Turkish war. For a while, Christian Assyrians supported the uprising because it was presented as a way to protect them from raids by Kurdish bandits, which neither the Ottomans or the Iranians were able or willing to prevent. In September 1880, Ubeydullah wrote to Joseph Cochrane, elaborating what the Qajar Empire had done to upset Kurdish tribes. In August 1880, the decision for an uprising was taken after a meeting of about 220 Kurdish chieftains. The forces of Sheikh Ubeydullah were well equipped, they had a large amount of breech loading Martini rifles.

Uprising 
80,000 rebels charged against the Iranians and initially the uprising was a success. Ubeydullah's troops were deployed into three separate forces, of which his sons led the first two. The first force heading to Mahabad was led by Abdulkadir Ubeydullah, the second force heading to Marageh was led by Siddiq Ubeydullah, and the third force of 5,000 men were led by, his brother in law, Sheikh Muhammad Said. Iranian soldiers were not well-equipped like the rebels, who soon occupied Mahabad and Maragheh. The capture of Tabriz was a failure, so instead the rebels looted captured territories. In the first two weeks of the uprising, Sheikh Ubeydullah fought in battles and attempted to seize Urmia. The city's Shia population refused to surrender to the Sunni rebels, who in the end couldn't capture it.

Abdulkadir Ubeydullah and his force retreated to Mahabad, which they held for a few days, because of Qajar forces coming from Tabriz. After eight weeks, the Kurdish rebels retreated and Sheikh Ubeydullah returned to Nehri. Eventually, Ubeydullah travelled to Istanbul asking the Ottomans for diplomatic support. Following his travel, the Ottomans began extensive negotiations with the Qajars on how to solve the conflict. Despite his rebellion against them in 1879, the Ottomans didn't want to loose the possibility of assistance from Sheikh Ubeydullah's troops in an eventual war against the Qajars in the future. After all, Sheikh Ubeydullah was able to raise a considerable amount of troops. Both the Ottomans and the Qajars demanded reparations from the other side due to their losses they experienced from Ubeydullah's rebellions.

Aftermath 
In August 1882, Sheikh Ubeydullah lost hopes for negotiating his peoples’ independence, and left Istanbul to return to his hometown Nehri. The Ottomans ordered the capture of Sheikh Ubeydullah in October 1882, as a result of pressure from the European powers, due to Ubeydullah's treatment of the Christian Nestorians. After his capture, he was brought to Istanbul and then exiled to Hejaz.

Legacy 
In the words of Kurdologist and Iranologist Garnik Asatrian:

References

Further reading 
 

Kurdish rebellions
History of the Ottoman Empire
Conflicts in 1880
Conflicts in 1879
1879 in the Ottoman Empire
1880 in the Ottoman Empire
19th century in Iran
Qajar Iran